Asthmatic Kitty is an American independent record label founded in 1999 by a community of musicians from Holland, Michigan led by Sufjan Stevens and his stepfather Lowell Brams. Some were Holland natives, and others had come to attend local colleges and universities. While the original Holland nucleus has dispersed across the country, the community has grown, with new artists and shared projects with other independent labels. The Library Catalog Music Series, inaugurated in 2009, showcases instrumental music by a wide variety of musicians, with eighteen albums in print as of February 2013, and more scheduled for release. Asthmatic Kitty is now based in Lander, Wyoming, Atlanta, Georgia and Brooklyn, New York.

The label's name refers to Sara, a stray with feline asthma adopted by Lowell in 1994. From 2002 on, she lived in Lander, Wyoming (elevation 5,358 ft / 1,633 m), where the thin, dry air alleviated most of her asthma symptoms. Sara died in December 2008, aged fifteen or sixteen years old.

Unusual Animals 2007–2010 was a special series of limited edition vinyl, parties, art and music events. In 2007 The Unusual Animals Project Space founded by Michael Kaufmann at the Harrison Center for the Arts in Indianapolis featured exhibitions by Cindy Hinant and Stuart Snoddy.

In 2020, Sufjan Stevens and Lowell Brams released Aporia, a 21-track album. The album has been described as "mixing organic instrumentation with experimental electronics, intertwining both new age and ambient music."

Active artists

 James McAlister 900X
 Angelo De Augustine
 Castanets
 Denison Witmer
 Half-handed Cloud
 Linda Perhacs
 Sisyphus
 Sufjan Stevens
 The Welcome Wagon

Inactive artists and alumni

 Bunky
 Chris Schlarb
 Cryptacize
 DM Stith
 Dots Will Echo
 Epstein
 Fol Chen
 Helado Negro
 Hermas Zopoula
 I Heart Lung
 Jookabox
 Julianna Barwick
 Land of a Thousand Rappers
 Lily & Madeleine
 Liz Janes
 Mozart's Sister
 My Brightest Diamond
 Ombre
 Osso String Quartet
 Pepe Deluxé
 Rafter
 Raymond Byron and the White Freighter
 Roberts and Lord
 Royal City
 Shannon Stephens
 Shapes and Sizes
 The Curtains
 Trumans Water

See also
 List of record labels

References

External links
 Official site
 Interview with Lowell Brams
 Interview with Michael Kaufmann

American independent record labels
Record labels established in 1999
Indie rock record labels
Experimental music record labels
Companies based in Indianapolis
Companies based in Wyoming
Companies based in New York City
1999 establishments in Michigan